Monica Guerritore (5 January 1958 in Rome, Italy) is an Italian actress of cinema, theatre and television.

Biography
Born in Rome to a Neapolitan father and a Calabrian mother, after her debut at just sixteen years of age under the direction of Giorgio Strehler in The Cherry Orchard (however, she had her first small part in Vittorio De Sica's Una breve vacanza, at the early age of 13), she tied herself romantically and artistically to film and theatre director Gabriele Lavia, acting in his theatrical performances mostly strong female characters like Jocasta, Lady Macbeth and Ophelia. Miss Julie in Strindberg's drama. The couple separated in 2001, during the rehearsals of Ingmar Bergman's Scenes from a Marriage in which she played a moving Marianne. Guerritore continued her work with other directors, like Giancarlo Sepe, in Madame Bovary, Carmen and in The Lady of the Camellias.

Beside the stage career, she also works on television and film: in 1976 along Marcello Mastroianni in Signore e signori, buonanotte, in 1977 she plays the title role in first RAI colour TV play Manon Lescaut, also, significant performances were in Salvatore Samperi's  Fotografando Patrizia (1985) and in Mauro Bolognini's La Venexiana (1986).

She stayed far away from television for 17 years and came back on screen RAI in 1997, with title role in Costanza, and in 1999, in Mario Caiano's L'amore oltre la vita. In 2004 she plays Ambra Leonardi in Amanti e segreti, and in 2006 Ada Sereni in Gianluigi Calderone's Exodus.

Gabriele Lavia directed her in many, often erotically toned, movies, including Scandalosa Gilda (1985), Sensi (1986) and the sicilian masterpiece by Giovanni Verga  La lupa (1996). In 2007 she plays a part in Ferzan Özpetek's Un giorno perfetto, and in 2008 in Ivano De Matteo's La bella gente.

She has performed Saint Monica in Christian Duguay's Sant'Agostino . The English version called "Restless Heart, The Confessions of St. Augustine", Ignatius Press 2013.
In Eduardo's play Saturday, Sunday and Monday in 2013 and Rosa Tomei Trilussa in 2014.

She was starring in the role of a mother killer in NON UCCIDERE ( 2015 ) but she quit the sequel because she did not agree on the guidelines of the script of the second season.

In theatre, she also wrote and directed Giovanna d'Arco (2004–2006), and Dall'Inferno all'Infinito (2008). In 2012 she is invited at Spoleto Festival with her work titled  MI chiedete di parlare in which she performed Oriana Fallaci in a play she wrote and directed.
She was in the Peter Quilter 's Broadway hit End of the Rainbow where she performed Judy Garland directed by Juan Diego Puerta Lopez.
In 2015/2016 she directed and performed in Donald Margulies 's 'Collected stories'Qualcosa Rimane  and is now adapting for stage Husband and Wives http://www.monicaguerritore.it/maritiemogli.php from the movie of Woody Allen. She has been nominated for the NASTRI D'ARGENTO 2016 as BEST ACTRESS for the film LA BELLA GENTE Directed by Ivano De Matteo 
In 2014 she is President of the Literary Jury of Premio Campiello.
In 2011 President Giorgio Napolitano named her Commander in the Order of Merit of the Italian Republic for her commitment to the Arts and Culture.
2018 CINEMA Leading role in blockbuster PUOI BACIARE LO SPOSO‘Puoi baciare lo sposo’ hilarious comedy on the topic of homosexuality in italian families.
 
2017/2018 Woody Allen allowed her adaptation of Husbands and wives for a theatrical text https://www.facebook.com/MARITIEMOGLITEATRO/

2019 Direction and leading role ( Shen te -Shui ta ) in Brecht's Good soul of Sezuan. Opening 29 /10/19

Works

Cinema

Television

Theatre

References

External links

 Official site - monicaguerritore.it 
 Official blog 
 
 Quel che so di lei - Libri Longanesi 2019

1958 births
Living people
Actresses from Rome
20th-century Italian actresses
Italian film actresses
Italian television actresses
Italian stage actresses
21st-century Italian actresses
People of Campanian descent
People of Calabrian descent